N-type may refer to:
 N-type semiconductor is a key material in the manufacture of transistors and integrated circuits
 An N-type connector is a threaded RF connector used to join coaxial cables
 The MG N-type Magnette was produced by the MG Car company from October 1934 to 1936
 The N-type calcium channel is a type of voltage-dependent calcium channel
 A Type (model theory) with n free variables

N type (no hyphen) could refer to:
 The Dennis N-Type vehicle chassis was used to build fire engines and trucks
 The N type carriage is an intercity passenger carriage used on the railways of Victoria, Australia
 The REP Type N was a military reconnaissance aircraft produced in France in 1914
 N type battery, see: N battery